La Gauloise de Trinité is a football team located in La Trinité, Martinique. It is part of the multi-sport club La Gauloise de Trinité.

History 
The club of La Gauloise de Trinité was founded in 1920, and so was its football team.

Gauloise has won a total of five Martinique Championnat National, its last title coming in 1980. It has also won the Coupe de la Martinique on two occasions and has lost in the final two other times. The club has also participated in the Coupe de France preliminary rounds over the years, notably reaching the seventh round in the 1993–94 edition before losing 3–0 to French third-tier side Lorient.

Honours

Notable players 
 Jacques Laposte
 Dominique Pandor
 Patrick Percin

References

External links 
 Profile on Ligue de football de la Martinique

Football clubs in Martinique
Association football clubs established in 1920
1920 establishments in Martinique